Trionfi ('triumphs') are 15th-century Italian playing cards with allegorical content related to those used in tarocchi games. The general English expression "trump card" and the German "trumpfen" (in card games) have developed from the Italian "Trionfi".  Most cards feature the personification of a place or abstraction.

History

Many of the motifs found in trionfi are found in trionfo, theatrical processions that were popular in the Italian Renaissance. The Palazzo Schifanoia in Ferrara, once owned by the ducal House of Este, contains many murals depicting these floats. Petrarch wrote a poem called I Trionfi which may have served as inspiration.

The earliest known use of the name "Trionfi" in relation to cards can be dated to 16 September 1440 in the records of a Florentine notary, Giusto Giusti. He recorded a transaction where he transferred two expensive personalized decks to Sigismondo Pandolfo Malatesta.

In a letter from 11 November 1449, Antonio Jacopo Marcello used the expression triumphorum genus for a deck that was produced sometime between 1418 and 1425. It was commissioned by the duke of Milan, Filippo Maria Visconti, painted by Michelino da Besozzo and described in an accompanying text by Martiano da Tortona. The deck itself is lost, but Marcello provided a copy of da Tortona's description which offers details about the deck and a cursory explanation of how it is played. It likely had a total of 60 cards (four kings, forty pip cards and sixteen trumps). The forty-four plain-suited cards used birds as suit signs and the trumps presented sixteen Roman gods. In two suits, the pip cards are in reverse order as in many of the oldest card games.

Two decks from June 1457 seem to relate to a visit at Ferrara of the young Milanese heir of the dukedom Galeazzo Maria Sforza in July/August 1457. Each deck consisted of 70 cards — the modern Tarot deck typically has 78.

The first attestation of a deck with 78 cards was in a poem by Matteo Maria Boiardo of Ferrara written between 1461–1494. The deck was structured like modern tarots, but the motifs and suits signs of the Boiardo deck are totally different. He used classical figures for the face cards and trumps. Pier Antonio Viti of Urbino (c. 1470-1500), brother of Timoteo Viti, provided a commentary of Boiardo's poem as well as rules. He likely commissioned the production of these decks of which two incomplete packs have survived. Both the rules and the deck were likely conscious departures from common trionfi decks.

The order of the trumps varied by region, perhaps as early as the 1440s. Michael Dummett placed them into three categories. In Bologna and Florence, the highest trump is the Angel, followed by the World. This group spread mainly southward through the Papal States, the Kingdom of Naples, and finally down to the Kingdom of Sicily but was also known in the Savoyard states. In Ferrara, the World was the highest, followed by Justice and the Angel. This group spread mainly to the northeast to Venice and Trento where it was only a passing fad. By the end of the 16th century, this order became extinct. In Milan, the World was the highest, followed by the Angel. This spread to Switzerland and France during the Italian Wars, becoming famous as the "Tarot of Marseilles".

The earliest known appearance of the word "Tarocho" as the new name for the game is in Brescia around 1502. "Tarochi" was used in June 1505 in Ferrara. In December 1505, "Taraux" decks are mentioned as being produced in the papal enclave of Avignon in France. Around this time, the word Trionfi seems to modify its character in a playing card context; it appears as a game of its own (Rabelais knows a "Tarau" and a "Triumphe" game) and seems no longer connected to the specific allegorical cards. This is most likely due to the popularity of Trionfa which usurped the old name. The word taroch was used as a synonym for foolishness in the same period.

Surviving decks

Expensive hand-painted, and usually gilded, decks custom-made for powerful clients have been preserved in greater numbers than mass-produced decks. More cards from the 15th and early 16th centuries have survived than those from the late 16th or 17th century.

Handmade
There are around 15 Visconti-Sforza tarot decks made for the rulers of Milan. These are the best preserved:
 The Cary-Yale deck is estimated to have been produced for the marriage of Bianca Maria Visconti and Francesco Sforza in October 1441
 The Pierpont-Morgan-Bergamo deck (estimated to be produced 1452) possibly relates to a trionfo in Milan, August 1453
 The Brera-Brambilla deck made for Francesco Sforza

The following decks were made in Florence:
 The Castello Ursino deck made for Alessandro Sforza
 The de Gaignières deck by the same artist as the one above, mistakenly attributed to Charles VI of France
 The Rothschild-Bassano deck, half of the pack survive but only one trump remains
 The Ercole d'Este deck in the Cary Collection

Uncut sheets
 The Cary sheet (c.1500) along with the six Novati cards (c.1600) found in Sforza Castle, Milanese ancestor to the Tarot of Marseilles
 The Budapest-Met sheets, examples of Ferrarese tarocchi (c.1500) which died out around 1600
 The Rothschild-Beaux Arts sheets, the earliest known Tarocco Bolognese cards (late 15th/early 16th century)
 The Rosenwald sheets, early Florentine tarots (late 15th century) before their development into Minchiate
 Various "Portuguese-suited" sheets and cards from the Papal States and the Kingdom of Naples; a relative of the Sicilian tarot

Decks with classical motifs
 At least two incomplete decks inspired by Boiardo's poem
 The copper-engraved Sola Busca tarot, late 15th century, only deck with all 78 cards intact 
 The Leber deck held in the Municipal Library of Rouen, early 16th century
 The Cicognara deck is lost but a few cards were copied, possibly created by the same person who made the Leber deck

See also

 Hofämterspiel
 Karnöffel
 Major Arcana
 Mantegna Tarocchi
 Tarot card games
 Trick-taking game
 Triomphe
 Trump (card games)

References and notes

External links

 History of Trionfi and Tarot cards
 Collection of documents with Trionfi notes in 15th century

Tarot
Playing cards
History of card decks